Jon Francis "Jack" Hughes (born July 20, 1957) is an American former professional ice hockey defenseman who played 46 games in the National Hockey League for the Colorado Rockies. He played with the American national team during the 1979–80 season, but was cut before they played at the Olympics. The team would end up playing in the Miracle on Ice and won the gold medal.

Regular season and playoffs

Awards and honors

References

External links
 

1957 births
Living people
American men's ice hockey forwards
Colorado Rockies (NHL) draft picks
Colorado Rockies (NHL) players
Fort Worth Texans players
Harvard Crimson men's ice hockey players
Ice hockey players from Massachusetts
Malden Catholic High School alumni
Sportspeople from Somerville, Massachusetts